Victor Lee "Vic" Auer (March 24, 1937 – May 3, 2011) was a sport shooter and Olympic medalist for the United States. He won a silver medal in the 50 metre rifle prone event at the 1972 Summer Olympics in Munich. He was born in Santa Ana, California. Auer's career was as a television scriptwriter.

References

1937 births
2011 deaths
Sportspeople from Santa Ana, California
American male sport shooters
United States Distinguished Marksman
ISSF rifle shooters
Olympic silver medalists for the United States in shooting
Shooters at the 1972 Summer Olympics
Shooters at the 1976 Summer Olympics
Medalists at the 1972 Summer Olympics
Pan American Games medalists in shooting
Pan American Games gold medalists for the United States
Shooters at the 1971 Pan American Games
Shooters at the 1975 Pan American Games